T'ai Chi Chih, abbreviated as TCC, is a series of 19 movements and 1 pose that together make up a meditative form of movement 
to which practitioners attribute physical, personal, and spiritual health benefits. The name "T'ai Chi Chih" is a registered trademark and is always title-cased. Some studies have found the practice to reduce stress and relieve certain ailments.

History
Developed in Albuquerque, New Mexico, in 1974 by Justin Stone (1916–2012), T'ai Chi Chih has spread mostly through word-of-mouth in a grassroots fashion among practicing individuals.

The form is taught and practiced in the US, Canada, France, Italy, New Zealand, Zimbabwe, Namibia, and other countries.

Characteristics
T'ai Chi Chih has visual similarities to t'ai chi ch'uan, but no martial arts aspect. According to practitioners, T'ai Chi Chih focuses on circulating, developing, and balancing  chi (in the traditional Chinese concept, a kind of spiritual energy residing in every living thing).

References

Bibliography

External links 
 T’ai Chi Chih: www.taichichih.org
 T’ai Chi Chih East: Promoting T'ai Chi Chih Events and Activities in the Eastern part of the US
 T’ai Chi Chih Community website

Tai chi styles
Neijia